The Zay (Zäy) is a river in Russian Federation, a left-bank tributary of the Kama.

At its headwaters the river is named the Steppe Zay (Stepnoy Zay, Dala Zäye). The lower reach of the river after the confluence with Forest Zay River, is named simply Zay. Also, one of headstream Steppe Zay's tributaries is also named Zay. Other major tributaries are the Moshkara, Zay-Karatay, Ursala, Aktashka, and Shumyshka rivers.

Drainage is regulated. There are two reservoirs, Zainsk and Karabash Reservoirs constructed in Zay valley. Since 1978 it is protected as a natural monument of Tatarstan. Zainsk, Almetyevsk and Karabash are along the river.

References 

Rivers of Tatarstan